Park station may refer to:

Park railway station, a former station in Manchester, England
Johannesburg Park Station, the main railway station in Johannesburg, South Africa

Similarly named stations:
Park Road railway station, a commuter rail station in Queensland, Australia
Park Royal tube station, an Underground station in London, England
Park West station, a Metromover station in Miami, Florida, United States

See also
Parc station (disambiguation)
Park Avenue station (disambiguation)
Park Lane station (disambiguation)
Park Place station (disambiguation)
Park Street station (disambiguation)
Park and ride, parking lots with public transport connections